The  ( or), commonly shortened to , is a concert hall in Vienna, Austria, which is located in the Innere Stadt district. The building opened in 1870 and is the home of the Vienna Philharmonic orchestra.

The acoustics of the building's 'Great Hall' have earned it recognition alongside other prominent concert halls, such as the Konzerthaus in Berlin, the Concertgebouw in Amsterdam and Symphony Hall in Boston. With the exception of Boston's Symphony Hall, none of these halls was built in the modern era with the application of architectural acoustics, and all share a long, tall and narrow shoebox shape.

Building

The building is located behind the Hotel Imperial that fronts on Kärntner Ring, which is part of the Vienna Ring Road (Ringstraße). It was erected as the new concert hall run by the Society of Friends of Music in Vienna, on a piece of land provided by Emperor Franz Joseph I of Austria in 1863.

The plans were designed by Danish architect Theophil Hansen in the Neoclassical style of an ancient Greek temple, including a concert hall and a smaller chamber music hall. The building was inaugurated on 6 January 1870.

It has 1,744 seats and standing room for 300. The Scandal Concert of 1913 was given there, and it is the venue for the annual Vienna New Year's Concert.

The Great Hall's lively acoustics are primarily based on Hansen's intuition, as he could not rely on any studies on architectural acoustics. The room's rectangular shape and proportions, its boxes and sculptures allow early and numerous sound reflections.

The Great Hall originally included a historic pipe organ built by Friedrich Ladegast. Its first organ recital was held by Anton Bruckner in 1872. The present-day instrument was originally installed in 1907 by the Austrian firm of Rieger Orgelbau, highly esteemed by musicians such as Franz Schmidt or Marcel Dupré, and rebuilt in 2011.

In 2001, a renovation program began. Several new rehearsal halls were installed in the basement.

Halls

The names of the six halls refer to gold, Johannes Brahms, glass, metal, stone and wood respectively.

References

External links
 
 

Music venues completed in 1870
Cultural venues in Vienna
Concert halls in Austria
Vienna Philharmonic
Event venues established in 1870
Buildings and structures in Innere Stadt
Theophil Hansen buildings
1870 establishments in Austria
19th-century architecture in Austria